Optima Signature (formerly Optima Chicago Center II) is a residential skyscraper in the Streeterville neighborhood of the Near North Side area in Chicago. The 57-story building is a joint venture between  Optima Inc. and DeBartolo Development. It opened for occupancy in June 2017. The building has 490 units.

History
Originally named Optima Chicago Center II and planned as a 55-story companion to the neighboring 42-story Optima Chicago Center that had been completed in 2013, the structure was initially planned to potentially be a hotel-apartment hybrid. By the time construction began in late 2014, the structure had a confirmed all-apartment 57-floor plan with 498 units. 

Construction was halted for a few months due to the planning process before resuming with $225 million in construction loans from Bank of America, PNC Bank and Fifth Third Bank in mid 2015. These final plans completed in 2015 revised the 57 floor structure to the eventual 490 units.

Description
The building is 57 stories high and includes 490 apartments, which are divided into two luxury classes. The Apex units have "upgraded finishes and features" as well as private club access. 

The entire building has access to two floors of athletic and social facilities. The building also has  of commercial space.

See also
 Architecture of Chicago
 List of tallest buildings in Chicago

Notes

External links
 Optima Signature at Emporis.com
 Optima Signature at Skyscrapercenter.com
 Official website

Residential skyscrapers in Chicago
Residential buildings completed in 2017
2017 establishments in Illinois